Reykjavík was one of the multi-member constituencies of the Althing, the national legislature of Iceland. The constituency was established in 1844 when the Althing was converted into a consultative assembly. It was abolished in 2003 when the constituency was split into two constituencies following the re-organisation of constituencies across Iceland. Reykjavík was conterminous with the municipality of Reykjavík.

Election results

Summary

(Excludes compensatory seats.)

Detailed

1990s

1999
Results of the 1999 parliamentary election held on 8 May 1999:

The following candidates were elected:
 Constituency seats - Ásta Ragnheiður Jóhannesdóttir (S), 19,092 votes; Björn Bjarnason (D), 29,997 votes; Bryndís Hlöðversdóttir (S), 19,095 votes; Davíð Oddsson (D), 30,023 votes; Finnur Ingólfsson (B), 6,542 votes; Geir Haarde (D), 30,124 votes; Guðmundur Hallvarðsson (D), 30,093 votes; Guðrún Ögmundsdóttir (S), 19,057 votes; Jóhanna Sigurðardóttir (S), 18,974 votes; Katrín Fjeldsted (D), 30,067 votes; Lára Margrét Ragnarsdóttir (D), 30,105 votes; Ögmundur Jónasson (U), 6,111 votes; Össur Skarphéðinsson (S), 19,042 votes; Pétur Blöndal (D), 30,110 votes; and Sólveig Pétursdóttir (D), 30,006 votes.
 Compensatory seats - Ásta Möller (D), 30,086 votes; Kolbrún Halldórsdóttir (U), 6,125 votes; Ólafur Örn Haraldsson (B), 6,783 votes; and Sverrir Hermannsson (F), 2,722 votes.

1995
Results of the 1995 parliamentary election held on 8 April 1995:

The following candidates were elected:
 Constituency seats - Björn Bjarnason (D), 27,630 votes; Bryndís Hlöðversdóttir (G), 9,386 votes; Davíð Oddsson (D), 27,663 votes; Finnur Ingólfsson (B), 9,411 votes; Friðrik Klemenz Sophusson (D), 27,570 votes; Geir Haarde (D), 27,650 votes; Guðmundur Hallvarðsson (D), 27,636 votes; Jóhanna Sigurðardóttir (J), 5,769 votes; Jón Baldvin Hannibalsson (A), 7,443 votes; Kristín Ástgeirsdóttir (V), 4,550 votes; Lára Margrét Ragnarsdóttir (D), 27,639 votes; Ólafur Örn Haraldsson (B), 9,681 votes; Össur Skarphéðinsson (A), 7,351 votes; Sólveig Pétursdóttir (D), 27,616 votes; and Svavar Gestsson (G), 9,365 votes.
 Compensatory seats - Ásta Ragnheiður Jóhannesdóttir (J), 5,740 votes; Guðný Guðbjörnsdóttir (V), 4,558 votes; Ögmundur Jónasson (G), 9,353 votes; and Pétur Blöndal (D), 27,607 votes.

1991
Results of the 1991 parliamentary election held on 20 April 1991:

The following candidates were elected:
 Constituency seats - Björn Bjarnason (D), 28,628 votes; Davíð Oddsson (D), 28,488 votes; Eyjólfur Konráð Jónsson (D), 28,586 votes; Finnur Ingólfsson (B), 5,979 votes; Friðrik Klemenz Sophusson (D), 28,641 votes; Geir Haarde (D), 28,617 votes; Guðrún Helgadóttir (G), 8,095 votes; Ingi Björn Albertsson (D), 28,528 votes; Ingibjörg Sólrún Gísladóttir (V), 7,433 votes; Jóhanna Sigurðardóttir (A), 9,140 votes; Jón Baldvin Hannibalsson (A), 9,023 votes; Lára Margrét Ragnarsdóttir (D), 28,663 votes; Sólveig Pétursdóttir (D), 28,645 votes; and Svavar Gestsson (G), 8,201 votes.
 Compensatory seats - Guðmundur Hallvarðsson (D), 28,658 votes; Kristín Ástgeirsdóttir (V), 7,430 votes; Kristín Einarsdóttir (V), 7,429 votes; and Össur Skarphéðinsson (A), 9,012 votes.

1980s

1987
Results of the 1987 parliamentary election held on 25 April 1987:

The following candidates were elected:
 Constituency seats - Albert Guðmundsson (S), 8,954 votes; Birgir Ísleifur Gunnarsson (D), 17,251 votes; Eyjólfur Konráð Jónsson (D), 17,256 votes; Friðrik Klemenz Sophusson (D), 17,104 votes; Guðmundur Ágústsson (S), 8,932 votes; Guðmundur G. Þórarinsson (B), 5,497 votes; Guðmundur H. Garðarsson (D), 17,245 votes; Guðrún Agnarsdóttir (V), 8,342 votes; Guðrún Helgadóttir (G), 8,164 votes; Jóhanna Sigurðardóttir (A), 9,468 votes; Jón Sigurðsson (A), 9,420 votes; Kristín Einarsdóttir (V), 8,335 votes; Ragnhildur Helgadóttir (D), 17,149 votes; and Svavar Gestsson (G), 8,154 votes.
 Compensatory seats - Aðalheiður Bjarnfreðinsdóttir (S), 8,950 votes; Geir Haarde (D), 17,250 votes; Jón Baldvin Hannibalsson (A), 9,450 votes; and Þórhildur Þorleifsdóttir (V), 8,324 votes.

1983
Results of the 1983 parliamentary election held on 23 April 1983:

The following candidates were elected:
 Constituency seats - Albert Guðmundsson (D), 21,692 votes; Birgir Ísleifur Gunnarsson (D), 19,974 votes; Ellert Schram (D), 19,055 votes; Friðrik Klemenz Sophusson (D), 20,870 votes; Guðmundur J. Guðmundsson (G), 9,183 votes; Jón Baldvin Hannibalsson (A), 5,451 votes; Ólafur Jóhannesson (B), 4,778 votes; Pétur Sigurðsson (D), 17,243 votes; Ragnhildur Helgadóttir (D), 18,158 votes; Sigríður Dúna Kristmundsdóttir (V), 4,246 votes; Svavar Gestsson (G), 9,630 votes; and Vilmundur Gylfason (C), 4,780 votes.
 Compensatory seats - Guðrún Agnarsdóttir (V), 4,070 votes; Guðrún Helgadóttir (G), 8,815 votes; Jóhanna Sigurðardóttir (A), 5,242 votes; and Kristín S. Kvaran (C), 4,581 votes.

1970s

1979
Results of the 1979 parliamentary election held on 2 and 3 December 1979:

The following candidates were elected:
 Constituency seats - Albert Guðmundsson (D), 20,465 votes; Benedikt Sigurðsson Gröndal (A), 8,650 votes; Birgir Ísleifur Gunnarsson (D), 19,633 votes; Friðrik Klemenz Sophusson (D), 17,833 votes; Geir Hallgrímsson (D), 21,330 votes; Gunnar Thoroddsen (D), 18,697 votes; Guðmundur J. Guðmundsson (G), 10,383 votes; Guðmundur G. Þórarinsson (B), 6,916 votes; Ólafur Jóhannesson (B), 7,246 votes; Ólafur Ragnar Grímsson (G), 9,937 votes; Svavar Gestsson (G), 10,877 votes; and Vilmundur Gylfason (A), 8,306 votes.
 Compensatory seats - Guðrún Helgadóttir (G), 9,527 votes; Jóhanna Sigurðardóttir (A), 7,959 votes; and Pétur Sigurðsson (D), 16,948 votes.

1978
Results of the 1978 parliamentary election held on 25 June 1978:

The following candidates were elected:
 Constituency seats - Albert Guðmundsson (D), 19,375 votes; Benedikt Sigurðsson Gröndal (A), 11,122 votes; Einar Ágústsson (B), 4,103 votes; Ellert Schram (D), 17,050 votes; Eðvarð Sigurðsson (G), 11,504 votes; Geir Hallgrímsson (D), 18,556 votes; Gunnar Thoroddsen (D), 16,200 votes; Jóhanna Sigurðardóttir (A), 10,224 votes; Ragnhildur Helgadóttir (D), 17,875 votes; Svava Jakobsdóttir (G), 11,004 votes; Svavar Gestsson (G), 11,987 votes; and Vilmundur Gylfason (A), 10,677 votes.
 Compensatory seats - Björn Jónsson (A), 9,754 votes; Friðrik Klemenz Sophusson (D), 15,413 votes; and Ólafur Ragnar Grímsson (G), 10,430 votes.

1974
Results of the 1974 parliamentary election held on 30 June 1974:

The following candidates were elected:
 Constituency seats - Albert Guðmundsson (D), 17,938 votes; Einar Ágústsson (B), 7,678 votes; Ellert Schram (D), 19,000 votes; Eðvarð Sigurðsson (G), 9,453 votes; Geir Hallgrímsson (D), 23,986 votes; Gunnar Thoroddsen (D), 22,998 votes; Gylfi Þorsteinsson Gíslason (A), 4,005 votes; Jóhann Hafstein (D), 20,960 votes; Magnús Kjartansson (G), 9,872 votes; Pétur Sigurðsson (D), 20,000 votes; Ragnhildur Helgadóttir (D), 22,013 votes; and Þórarinn Þórarinsson (B), 8,001 votes.
 Compensatory seats - Eggert Gíslason Þorsteinsson (A), 2,036 votes; Guðmundur H. Garðarsson (D), 3,003 votes; Magnús Torfi Ólafsson (F), 1,650 votes; and Svava Jakobsdóttir (G), 3,291 votes.

1971
Results of the 1971 parliamentary election held on 13 June 1971:

The following candidates were elected:
 Constituency seats - Auður Auðuns (D), 16,499 votes; Einar Ágústsson (B), 6,482 votes; Eðvarð Sigurðsson (G), 8,473 votes; Geir Hallgrímsson (D), 18,058 votes; Gunnar Thoroddsen (D), 17,127 votes; Gylfi Þorsteinsson Gíslason (A), 4,446 votes; Jóhann Hafstein (D), 18,794 votes; Magnús Kjartansson (G), 8,845 votes; Magnús Torfi Ólafsson (F), 4,015 votes; Pétur Sigurðsson (D), 15,729 votes; Ragnhildur Helgadóttir (D), 14,947 votes; and Þórarinn Þórarinsson (B), 6,755 votes.
 Compensatory seats - Bjarni Guðnason (F), 2,009 votes; Eggert Gíslason Þorsteinsson (A), 2,234 votes; Ellert Schram (D), 2,698 votes; and Svava Jakobsdóttir (G), 2,950 votes.

1960s

1967
Results of the 1967 parliamentary election held on 11 June 1967:

The following candidates were elected:
 Constituency seats - Auður Auðuns (D), 16,755 votes; Birgir Kjaran (D), 15,314 votes; Bjarni Benediktsson (D), 17,468 votes; Eggert Gíslason Þorsteinsson (A), 6,838 votes; Einar Ágústsson (B), 6,541 votes; Gylfi Þorsteinsson Gíslason (A), 7,128 votes; Hannibal Valdimarsson (I), 3,519 votes; Jóhann Hafstein (D), 15,978 votes; Magnús Kjartansson (G), 5,419 votes; Ólafur Björnsson (D), 13,866 votes; Pétur Sigurðsson (D), 14,585 votes; and Þórarinn Þórarinsson (B), 6,823 votes.
 Compensatory seats - Eðvarð Sigurðsson (G), 2,712 votes; Sigurður Ingimundarson (A), 2,379 votes; and Sveinn Guðmundsson (D), 2,501 votes.

1963
Results of the 1963 parliamentary election held on 9 June 1963:

The following candidates were elected:
 Constituency seats - Alfreð Gíslason (G), 6,387 votes; Auður Auðuns (D), 18,319 votes; Bjarni Benediktsson (D), 19,112 votes; Eggert Gíslason Þorsteinsson (A), 5,489 votes; Einar Ágústsson (B), 5,918 votes; Einar Olgeirsson (G), 6,671 votes; Gunnar Thoroddsen (D), 16,716 votes; Gylfi Þorsteinsson Gíslason (A), 5,725 votes; Jóhann Hafstein (D), 17,523 votes; Ólafur Björnsson (D), 15,136 votes; Pétur Sigurðsson (D), 15,921 votes; and Þórarinn Þórarinsson (B), 6,166 votes.
 Compensatory seats - Davíð Ólafsson (D), 2,732 votes; Eðvarð Sigurðsson (G), 2,226 votes; and Sigurður Ingimundarson (A), 1,910 votes.

1950s

October 1959
Results of the October 1959 parliamentary election held on 25 and 26 October 1959:

The following candidates were elected:
 Constituency seats - Alfreð Gíslason (G), 6,266 votes; Auður Auðuns (D), 15,777 votes; Bjarni Benediktsson (D), 16,454 votes; Eggert Gíslason Þorsteinsson (A), 5,692 votes; Einar Olgeirsson (G), 6,541 votes; Gunnar Thoroddsen (D), 14,400 votes; Gylfi Þorsteinsson Gíslason (A), 5,930 votes; Jóhann Hafstein (D), 15,093 votes; Ólafur Björnsson (D), 13,040 votes; Pétur Sigurðsson (D), 12,344 votes; Ragnhildur Helgadóttir (D), 13,727 votes; and Þórarinn Þórarinsson (B), 4,097 votes.
 Compensatory seats - Birgir Kjaran (D), 2,059 votes; Eðvarð Sigurðsson (G), 2,181 votes; and Sigurður Ingimundarson (A), 1,982 votes.

June 1959
Results of the June 1959 parliamentary election held on 28 June 1959:

The following candidates were elected:
 Constituency seats - Bjarni Benediktsson (D), 17,470 votes; Björn Ólafsson (D), 16,270 votes; Einar Olgeirsson (G), 6,403 votes; Gunnar Thoroddsen (D), 14,199 votes; Gylfi Þorsteinsson Gíslason (A), 4,543 votes; Jóhann Hafstein (D), 15,291 votes; Ragnhildur Helgadóttir (D), 13,130 votes; and Þórarinn Þórarinsson (B), 4,320 votes. 
 Compensatory seats - Eggert Gíslason Þorsteinsson (A), 2,351 votes; and Hannibal Valdimarsson (G), 3,299 votes.

1956
Results of the 1956 parliamentary election held on 24 June 1956:

The following candidates were elected:
 Constituency seats - Bjarni Benediktsson (D), 16,380 votes; Björn Ólafsson (D), 15,106 votes; Einar Olgeirsson (G), 7,904 votes; Gunnar Thoroddsen (D), 13,328 votes; Hannibal Valdimarsson (G), 7,410 votes; Haraldur Guðmundsson (A), 6,055 votes; Jóhann Hafstein (D), 14,341 votes; and Ragnhildur Helgadóttir (D), 12,326 votes.
 Compensatory seats - Alfreð Gíslason (G), 2,747 votes; Gylfi Þorsteinsson Gíslason (A), 3,153 votes; and Ólafur Björnsson (D), 2,821 votes.

1953
Results of the 1953 parliamentary election held on 28 June 1953:

The following candidates were elected:
 Constituency seats - Bjarni Benediktsson (D), 11,800 votes; Björn Ólafsson (D), 10,312 votes; Einar Olgeirsson (C), 6,556 votes; Gils Guðmundsson (F), 2,570 votes; Gunnar Thoroddsen (D), 9,551 votes; Haraldur Guðmundsson (A), 4,832 votes; Jóhann Hafstein (D), 10,296 votes; and Sigurður Guðnason (C), 6,143 votes.
 Compensatory seats - Bergur Sigurbjörnsson (F), 1,365 votes; Brynjólfur Bjarnason (C), 2,235 votes; and Gylfi Þorsteinsson Gíslason (A), 2,468 votes.

1940s

1949
Results of the 1949 parliamentary election held on 23 and 24 October 1949:

The following candidates were elected:
 Constituency seats - Bjarni Benediktsson (D), 12,683 votes; Björn Ólafsson (D), 11,615 votes; Einar Olgeirsson (C), 8,141 votes; Gunnar Thoroddsen (D), 10,324 votes; Haraldur Guðmundsson (A), 4,346 votes; Jóhann Hafstein (D), 10,564 votes; Rannveig Þorsteinsdóttir (B), 2,956 votes; and Sigurður Guðnason (C), 7,541 votes.
 Compensatory seats - Brynjólfur Bjarnason (C), 2,711 votes; Gylfi Þorsteinsson Gíslason (A), 2,210 votes; and Kristín L. Sigurðardóttir (D), 2,598 votes.

1946
Results of the 1946 parliamentary election held on 30 June 1946:

The following candidates were elected:
 Constituency seats - Einar Olgeirsson (C), 6,877 votes; Gylfi Þorsteinsson Gíslason (A), 4,484 votes; Hallgrímur Benediktsson (D), 10,572 votes; Jóhann Hafstein (D), 9,105 votes; Pétur Magnússon (D), 11,268 votes; Sigfús Sigurhjartarson (C), 6,446 votes; Sigurður Guðnason (C), 6,015 votes; and Sigurður Kristjánsson (D), 9,842 votes.
 Compensatory seats - Bjarni Benediktsson (D), 2,316 votes; Katrín Thoroddsen (C), 1,748 votes; and Sigurjón Á. Ólafsson (A), 1,285 votes.

October 1942
Results of the October 1942 parliamentary election held on 18 and 19 October 1942:

The following candidates were elected:
 Constituency seats - Bjarni Benediktsson (D), 6,936 votes; Brynjólfur Bjarnason (C), 5,549 votes; Einar Olgeirsson (C), 5,921 votes; Jakob Möller (D), 7,230 votes; Magnús Jónsson (D), 7,766 votes; Sigfús Sigurhjartarson (C), 5,181 votes; Sigurður Kristjánsson (D), 6,621 votes; and Stefán Jóhann Stefánsson (A), 3,226 votes.
 Compensatory seats - Haraldur Guðmundsson (A), 1,652 votes; Pétur Magnússon (D), 1,658 votes; and Sigurður Guðnason (C), 1,495 votes.

July 1942
Results of the July 1942 parliamentary election held on 5 July 1942:

The following candidates were elected:
 Constituency seats - Bjarni Benediktsson (D), 7,122 votes; Brynjólfur Bjarnason (C), 4,848 votes; Einar Olgeirsson (C), 5,290 votes; Jakob Möller (D), 7,853 votes; Magnús Jónsson (D), 8,553 votes; and Stefán Jóhann Stefánsson (A), 3,163 votes.
 Compensatory seats - Sigfús Sigurhjartarson (C), 4,409 votes; Sigurður Kristjánsson (D), 6,623 votes; and Sigurjón Á. Ólafsson (A), 3,015 votes.

1930s

1937
Results of the 1937 parliamentary election held on 29 June 1937:

The following candidates were elected:
 Constituency seats - Einar Olgeirsson (K), 2,718 votes; Héðinn Valdimarsson (A), 4,069 votes; Jakob Möller (S), 9,130 votes; Magnús Jónsson (S), 10,005 votes; Pétur Halldórsson (S), 8,340 votes; and Sigurður Kristjánsson (S), 7,497 votes.
 Compensatory seats - Brynjólfur Bjarnason (K), 2,489 votes; Guðrún Lárusdóttir (S), 6,658 votes; and Sigurjón Á. Ólafsson (A), 3,728 votes.

1934
Results of the 1934 parliamentary election held on 24 June 1934:

The following candidates were elected:
 Constituency seats - Héðinn Valdimarsson (A), 4,982 votes; Jakob Möller (S), 6,306 votes; Magnús Jónsson (S), 7,392 votes; Pétur Halldórsson (S), 6,202 votes; Sigurjón Á. Ólafsson (A), 4,564 votes; and Sigurður Kristjánsson (S), 5,565 votes.
 Compensatory seats - Guðrún Lárusdóttir (S), 4,941 votes; and Stefán Jóhann Stefánsson (A), 4,156 votes.

1933
Results of the 1933 parliamentary election held on 16 July 1933:

The following candidates were elected:
Héðinn Valdimarsson (A), 3,239 votes; Jakob Möller (S), 5,569 votes; Magnús Jónsson (S), 4,273 votes; and Pétur Halldórsson (S), 2,902 votes.

1931
Results of the 1931 parliamentary election held on 12 June 1931:

The following candidates were elected:
Einar Arnórsson (S), 4,174 votes; Héðinn Valdimarsson (A), 2,625 votes; Jakob Möller (S), 5,543 votes; and Magnús Jónsson (S), 2,802 votes.

1920s

1927
Results of the 1927 parliamentary election held on 9 July 1927:

The following candidates were elected:
Héðinn Valdimarsson (A), 2,487 votes; Jón Ólafsson (Í), 2,649 votes; Magnús Jónsson (Í), 3,440 votes; and Sigurjón Á. Ólafsson (A), 1,858 votes.

1923
Results of the 1923 parliamentary election held on 27 October 1923:

The following candidates were elected:
Jón Baldvinsson (A), 2,491 votes; Jón Þorláksson (B), 4,879 votes; Jakob Möller (B), 3,697 votes; and Magnús Jónsson (B), 2,478 votes.

1910s

1919
Results of the 1919 parliamentary election held on 15 November 1919:

Jakob Möller (U(S)) and Sveinn Björnsson (U(H)) were elected.

October 1916
Results of the October 1916 parliamentary election held on 21 October 1916:

Jón Magnússon (H) and Jörundur Brynjólfsson (A) were elected.

1914
Results of the 1914 parliamentary election held on 11 April 1914:

Jón Magnússon and Sveinn Björnsson were elected.

1911
Results of the 1911 parliamentary election held on 28 October 1911:

Jón Jónsson and Lárus H. Bjarnason were elected.

1900s

1908
Results of the 1908 parliamentary election held on 10 September 1908:

Jón Þorkelsson and Magnús Blöndahl were elected.

References

1844 establishments in Iceland
2003 disestablishments in Iceland
Constituencies established in 1844
Constituencies disestablished in 2003
Former Althing constituencies
Althing constituency